The 2020 San Miguel Corporation (SMC) - Philippine Sportswriters Association (PSA) Annual Awards was an annual awarding ceremony honoring the individuals (athletes, coaches and officials) and organizations that made a significant impact to Philippine sports in 2019, which was led by the medalists of the 2019 Southeast Asian Games hosted by the country.

The event is organized by the Philippine Sportswriters Association under the leadership of Eriberto "Tito" S. Talao (sports editor of the Manila Bulletin). The PSA is the oldest Philippine-based media organization, which is founded in 1949, and made up of veteran and seasoned sports scribes, section editors and columnists from print media (broadsheets and tabloids), sports news websites and social media platforms.

Among the awards set to be received this year are the Athlete of the Year (Team Philippines), Lifetime Achievement Award (Efren "Bata" Reyes), President's Award (Carlos Yulo), Executive of the Year (William "Butch" Ramirez), Mr. Basketball (Thirdy Ravena), Ms. Volleyball (Sisi Rondina), Mr. Volleyball (Bryan Bagunas), Mr. Football (Stephan Schröck), Ms. Golf (Bianca Pagdanganan), National Sports Association of the Year (Association of Boxing Alliances in the Philippines), Major Awards, Minor Citations, Tony Siddayao Awards for Under 17 Athletes, Posthumous Recognition, Milo Junior Athletes of the Year, and the Chooks-To-Go Fan Favorite Award.

There will be a new set of awards including the Ms. Basketball (Jack Danielle Aninam) and Coach of the Year (Patrick Aquino) which will be handed out starting this year.

Three-time PSA Athlete of the Year (1999, 2001 and 2006) awardee and Philippine billiards legend Efren "Bata" Reyes, who will also set to receive the Lifetime Achievement Award served as the guest speaker.

Top sports officials led by PSC Chairman and Executive of the Year awardee William "Butch" Ramirez, International Olympic Committee (IOC) representative to the Philippines Mikee Cojuangco-Jaworski, House Speaker and Philippine SEA Games Organizing Committee Chairman Alan Peter Cayetano, Deputy House Speaker Mikee Romero, and POC President Abraham "Bambol" Tolentino are expected to attend the occasion.

The awards night was held on March 6, 2020 at the Centennial Hall of the Manila Hotel in Manila.

Honor roll

Main awards
The following are the list of main awards of the event.

Athletes of the Year
For claiming their second overall championship in the 2019 Southeast Asian Games hosted in the country, the PSA bestowed the Athlete of the Year honors to the Philippine National Team participated in the biennial meet. This is the second time that the National Team won the Athlete of the Year award. They were recognized with the same honors in the 2006 PSA Annual Awards after securing the championship title of the 2005 SEA Games, also held in the Philippines.

The Philippine delegation, which composed of 1,115 national athletes, took home a total of 387 medals (149 golds, 117 silvers, and 121 bronzes; hitting a new record high for most number of medals since the Philippines joined the SEA Games in 1977) from the 11-nation regional sporting meet held from November 30 to December 11 at four major clusters, Clark, Subic, Metro Manila and Other Areas (Calabarzon-La Union).

Other major awards
Here are the other major awards to be conferred in the Awards Night.

Major awardees
Sorted in alphabetical order (based on their surnames).

Citations

2019 SEA Games Gold Medalists
All 149 gold medalists including those who won more than two or three golds in the Southeast Asian Games will get to receive the special citation from the PSA.

Aquatics – Swimming:
James Deiparine – Men’s 100M Breaststroke

Archery:
Paul Marton dela Cruz & Rachelle Anne Dela Cruz – Mixed Team Compound

Arnis:
Abegail Abad – Women’s Paddled Stick Welterweight +65 kg
Mike Bañares – Men’s Live Stick Welterweight +65 kg
Dexter Bolambao – Men’s Live Stick Bantamweight -55 kg
Villardo Canumay – Men’s Live Stick Lightweight -60-65 kg
Crisamuel Delfin – Men’s Anyo Open Weapon Non-Traditional
Mary Allin Aldeguer – Women’s Anyo Open Weapon Non-Traditional
Sheena del Monte – Women’s Paddled Stick Women’s Bantamweight -50 kg
Jesfer Huquire – Men’s Paddled Stick Bantamweight -55 kg
Elmer Manlapas – Men’s Paddled Stick Featherweight -55-60 kg
Ros Ashley Monville – Women’s Paddled Stick Lightweight -55-60 kg
Jezebel Morcillo – Women’s Live Stick Bantamweight -50 kg
Jedah Mae Soriano – Women’s Paddled Stick Featherweight -50-55 kg
Carloyd Tejada – Men’s Paddled Stick Men’s Welterweight +65 kg
Niño Mark Tolledo – Men’s Livestick Featherweight -55-60 kg

Athletics:
Clinton Kingsley Bautista – Men’s 110M Hurdles
Melvin Calano – Men’s Javelin Throw
Eric Shauwn Cray – Men’s 400M Hurdles
Sarah Dequilan – Women’s Heptathlon
Christine Hallasgo – Women’s Marathon
Eloiza Luzon, Anfernee Lopena, Kristina Marie Knott, Eric Shauwn Cray – Mixed 4x100M Relay
Kristina Marie Knott – Women’s 200M
William Morrison III – Men’s Shot Put
Ernest John Obiena – Men’s Pole Vault
Aries Toledo – Men’s Decathlon
Natalie Uy – Women’s Pole Vault

Baseball:
Team Pilipinas – Dino Emiglio Altomonte, Adriane Ros Bernardo, Erwin Bosito, Clarence Lyle Caasalan, Bryan Victrix Castillo, Alfredo de Guzman III, Junmar Diarao, Vladimir Eguia, Ignacio Luis Escano, Francis Michael Gesmundo, Arvin Maynard Herrera, Jarus Inobio, Romeo Jasmin Jr., Ferdinand Liguayan Jr., Juan Diego Lozano, Juan Alvaro Macasaet, Juan Paolo Macasaet, Mark Steven Manaig, Jennald Pareja, Jonash Ponce, Jon Jon Robles, Miguel Jose Salud, Kyle Rodrigo Villafaña Jr., Jerome Yenson – Men’s

Basketball – 3×3:
Gilas Pilipinas Men – CJ Perez, Jason Perkins, Moala Tautuaa, Chris Elijah Newsome – Men’s
Gilas Pilipinas Women – Jack Danielle Animam, Afril Bernardino, Clare Castro, Janine Pontejos – Women’s

Basketball – 5×5:
Gilas Pilipinas Men – Japeth Aguilar, June Mar Fajardo, Marcio Lassiter, Vic Manuel, Stanley Pringle, Kiefer Ravena, Troy Rosario, Chris Ross, Greg Slaughter, Christian Standhardinger, LA Tenorio, Matthew Wright – Men’s
Gilas Pilipinas Women – Jack Danielle Animam, Afril Bernardino, France Mae Cabinbin, Ana Alicia Katrina Castillo, Clare Castro, Eunique Chan, Kelli Casey Hayes, Danica Therese Jose, Ria Joy Nabalan, Janine Pontejos, Nathalia Prado, Marizze Andrea Tongco – Women’s

Billiards:
Rubilen Amit – Women’s 9-Ball Pool Singles
Rubilen Amit/Cheska Centeno – Women’s 9-Ball Pool Doubles
Cheska Centeno – Women’s 10-Ball Pool Singles
Dennis Orcollo – Men’s 10-Ball Pool Singles

Boxing:
Josie Gabuco – Women’s Light Flyweight 48 kg
Rogen Ladon – Men’s Flyweight 52 kg
Eumir Felix Marcial – Men’s Middleweight 75 kg
Carlo Paalam – Men’s Light Flyweight 46-49 kg
James Palicte – Men’s Light Welterweight 64 kg
Nesthy Petecio – Women’s Featherweight 57 kg
Charly Suarez – Men’s Lightweight 60 kg

Canoe/Kayak:
Hermie Macaranas – Men’s 100M Singles

Cycling:
Lea Denise Belgira – Women’s Mountain Bike Downhill
John Derick Farr – Men’s Mountain Bike Downhill
Jermyn Prado – Women’s Road Event Individual Time Trial

Dancesport:
Sean Mischa Aranar/Ana Leonila Nualla (3) – Standard All Five Dances/Tango/Vienniese Waltz
Wilbert Aunzo/Pearl Marie Cañeda (3) – Latin Samba/Chachacha/Rumba
Mark Jayson Gayon/Mary Joy Renigen (2) – Standard Waltz/Foxtrot
Michael Angelo Marquez/Stephanie Sabalo (2) – Latin All Five Dances/Pasodoble

Duathlon:
Monica Torres – Women’s Individual

eSports:
Team Sibol – Bryle Jacob “cml” Alvizo, James Erice “Erice” Guerra, Jun “Bok” Kanehara, Van Jerico “Van” Manalaysay, Marvin “Boomy” Rushton, John Anthony “Natsumi” Vargas, Mc Nicholson “Mac” Villanueva – DotA 2
Team Sibol – Jeniel “Haze” Bata-Anon, Angelo Kyle “Pheww” Arcangel, Allan Sancio “Lusty” Castromayor, Karl Gabriel “KarlTzy” Nepomuceno, Kenneth Jiane “Kenji” Villa, Carlito “Ribo” Ribo Jr., Jason Rafael “Jay” Torculas – Mobile Legends: Bang Bang
Caviar Napoleon “Enderr” Acampado – StarCraft II

Fencing:
Hanniel Abella, Mickyle Rein Bustos, Anna Gabriella Estimada, Harlene Raguin – Women’s Team Epee
Jylyn Nicanor – Women’s Individual Sabre

Golf:
Bianca Pagdanganan – Women’s Individual Match Play
Lois Kaye Go, Bianca Pagdanganan, Abby Arevalo – Women’s Team

Gymnastics – Artistic:
Carlos Edriel Yulo (2) – Men’s All-Around/Floor Exercise

Gymnastics – Rhythmic:
Daniela Reggie dela Pisa – Women’s Hoop

Jiujitsu:
Adrian Rodolfo Erwin Guggenheim – Men’s -77 kg
Meggie Ochoa – Women’s -45 kg
Carlo Angelo Peña – Men’s -56 kg
Annie Ramirez – Women’s -55 kg
Dean Michael Roxas – Men’s -85 kg

Judo:
Mariya Takahashi – Women’s -73 kg
Kiyomi Watanabe – Women’s -63 kg

Karatedo:
Jamie Lim – Women’s Individual Kumite +61 kg
Junna Tsukii – Women’s Individual Kumite -50 kg

Kickboxing:
Gina Iniong – Women’s Kick Light -55 kg
Jerry Olsim – Men’s Kick Light -69 kg
Jean Claude Saclag – Men’s Low Kick -63.5 kg

Kurash:
Estie Gay Liwanen – Women’s -63 kg

Lawn Bowls:
Rodel Labayo, Angelo Morales – Men’s Pairs

Modern Pentathlon:
Michael Ver Anton Comaling – Men’s Beach Triathle Individual
Princess Honey Arbilon, Samuel German – Beach Laser Mixed Relay

Muay:
Jearome Calica, Joemar Gallaza – Men’s Waikru Mai Muaythai
Phillip Delarmino – Men’s 57 kg
Ariel Lim Lampacan – Men’s 54 kg

Obstacle Course Race:
Sandi Abahan – Women’s Individual 5k x 20
Diana Buhler, Jeffrey Reginio, Klymille Keilah Rodriguez, Nathaniel Sanchez – Mixed Team Relay 400M x 12 Obstacle
Melvin Guarte – Men’s Individual 5k x 20
Kyle Redentor Antolin, Kaizen dela Serna, Monolito Divina, Deanne Nicole Moncada – Mixed Team Assist 400M x 12 Obstacle
Jeffrey Kevin Pascua – Men’s Individual 100M x 10 Obstacle
Rochelle Suarez – Women’s Individual 100M x 10 Obstacle

Pencak Silat:
Edmar Taquel – Men’s Seni Tunggal

Rowing:
Cris Nievarez – Men’s Lightweight Single Sculls
Melcah Jen Caballero – Women’s Lightweight Single Sculls

Rugby:
Philippine Volcanoes – Timothy Alfonso, Vincent Amar, Donald Canon, Harry Dionson, Tommy Kalaw, Robert Luceno, Patrice Ortiz, Joe Palabay, Ned Plarizan, Ryan Reyes, Luc Villalba, Justin Villazor – Men’s Rugby 7s

Sailing:
Lester Troy Tayong, Emerson Villena – Men’s International 470
Team Pilipinas – Ridgely Balladares, Rubin Cruz Jr., Whok Dimapilis, Richly Magsanay, Joel Mejarito, Edgar Villapaña (2) – Keelboat Fleet Racing/Keelboat Match Racing

Sambo:
Chino Sy-Tancontian – Men’s Sport -74 kg
Mark Streigl – Men’s Contact -74 kg

Sepaktakraw:
Team Pilipinas – Metodio Suico Jr, Jason Huerte, John Bobier, Emmanuel Escote, John Jeffrey Morcillos – Men’s Hoop
Team Pilipinas – Deseree Autor, Josefina Maat, Sarah Kalalo, Jean Marie Sucalit, Mary Ann Lopez – Women’s Hoop

Shooting:
Eric Ang, Carlos Conge Carag, Hagen Alexander Topacio – Men’s Trap Team
Elvie Baldivino, Marly Martir, Franchette Shayne Quiroz – Women’s WA 1500 PPC Team
Marly Martir – Women’s WA 1500 Precision Pistol Competition (PPC) Individual

Skateboarding:
Jaime de Lange – Men’s Downhill
Margielyn Didal (2) – Women’s Game of S.K.A.T.E./Street
Jericho Jojit Francisco Jr. – Men’s Park
Daniel Ledermann – Men’s Game of S.K.A.T.E.
Christiana Means – Women’s Park

Soft Tennis:
Team Pilipinas – Mark Alcoseba, Joseph Arcilla, Noel Damian Jr., Kevin Mamawal, Mikoff Manduriao, Dheo Talatayod – Men’s Team
Noelle Conchita Corazon Zoleta-Manalac – Women’s Individual Singles
Noelle Conchita Corazon Zoleta-Manalac, Noelle Nikki Camille Zoleta – Women’s Doubles

Softball:
RP Blu Girls – Francesca Altomonte, Mary Ann Antolihao, Riflayca Basa, Garnet Agnes Blando, Khrisha Genuary Cantor, Shaira Damasing, Elsie Dela Torre, Ma. Angelu Gabriel, Kaith Ezra Jalandoni, Mary Joy Maguad, Mary Nicole Pasadas, Ma. Celestine Palma, Royevel Palma, Cristy Joy Roa, Jenette Rusia, Angelie Ursabia, Arianne Vallestero – Women’s

Squash:
Kayod Pilipinas – Jemyca Aribado, Yvonne Alyssa Dalida, Reymark Begornia, Robert Andrew Garcia, David William Pelino – Mixed Team

Surfing:
Nilbie Blancada – Women’s Longboard Open
Roger Casogay – Men’s Longboard Open

Taekwondo – Kyorugi:
Kurt Bryan Barbosa – Men’s Finweight -54 kg
Dave Cea – Men’s Lightweight -74 kg
Pauline Lopez – Women’s Featherweight -57 kg
Samuel Morrison – Men’s Welterweight -80 kg

Taekwondo – Poomsae:
Jeordan Dominguez – Men’s Freestyle Individual
Jocel Lyn Ninobla – Women’s Recognized Individual
Dustin Jacob Mella, Raphael Enrico Mella, Rodolfo Reyes Jr. – Men’s Recognized Team
Rodolfo Reyes, Jr. – Men’s Recognized Individual

Tennis:
Francis Alcantara, Jeson Patrombon – Men’s Doubles

Triathlon:
John Chicano – Men’s Individual
Kim Mangrobang – Women’s Individual
Kim Mangrobang, Fernando Casares, Claire Adorna, John Chicano – Mixed Relay

Wakeboarding and Waterski:
Susan Larsson – Women’s Wakeskate
Jhondi Wallace – Men’s Wakeskate

Weightlifting:
Hidilyn Diaz – Women’s 55 kg
Kristel Macrohon – Women’s 71 kg

Windsurfing:
Geylord Coveta – Men’s RS: One
Yancy Kaibigan – Men’s RS: X (9.5M)

Wrestling:
Jason Baucas – Men’s Greco Roman 72 kg
Noel Norada – Men’s Greco Roman 63 kg

Wushu:
Jessie Aligaga – Men’s Sanda 48 kg
Arnel Mandal – Men’s Sanda 52 kg
Francisco Solis – Men’s Sanda 56kg
Clemente Tabugara – Men’s Sanda 65kg
Divine Wally – Women’s Sanda 48 kg
Agatha Wong (2) – Women’s Taolu Taijiquan/Taijijian

Other recipients
Sorted in alphabetical order (based on their surnames).

Milo Junior Athletes of the Year
The award, sponsored by Milo, will be given to the two young athletes who are excelled in the field of sports.

Tony Siddayao Awards for Under-17 Athletes
The award, which is named after Tony Siddayao (deceased, former sports editor of Manila Standard) is given out to outstanding junior athletes. Sorted in alphabetical order (based on their surnames).

Posthumous Awards for Deceased Sports Personalities
The following awards, will be bestowed upon former national & collegiate athletes, officials and sports personalities who passed away in 2019. They will be honor with a short audio-video presentation and a one-minute moment of silence.

See also
2019 in Philippine sports
37th SMB-SAC Cebu Sports Awards

References

PSA
PSA